Yurisel Laborde Duanes (born August 18, 1979) is a judoka from Cuba. At the 2004 Summer Olympics she won the bronze medal in the women's Half Heavyweight (78 kg) category, together with Lucia Morico of Italy. At the 2005 World Judo Championships Laborde won a gold medal in the same class.

External links
 
 

1979 births
Living people
Judoka at the 2004 Summer Olympics
Olympic judoka of Cuba
Olympic bronze medalists for Cuba
Judoka at the 2003 Pan American Games
Judoka at the 2007 Pan American Games
Olympic medalists in judo
Medalists at the 2004 Summer Olympics
Cuban female judoka
Pan American Games silver medalists for Cuba
Pan American Games medalists in judo
Central American and Caribbean Games gold medalists for Cuba
Competitors at the 2006 Central American and Caribbean Games
Central American and Caribbean Games medalists in judo
Medalists at the 2003 Pan American Games
Medalists at the 2007 Pan American Games
20th-century Cuban women
21st-century Cuban women